The Warburg station ( or Bf Warburg (Westf)) is located on the north-eastern edge of the German town of Warburg.

The station was built in 1852 and 1853. Warburg and Minden stations are the last stations from the early railway history of the Prussian province of Westphalia that are still in their original form as island stations (Inselbahnhöfen), with the station entrance buildings located between the tracks.

Location 
The station is located at Warburg on the double track and electrified Hamm–Warburg line to Hamm, the Frederick William Northern Railway to Kassel and the non-electrified Upper Ruhr Valley Railway to Hagen.

The former line to Volkmarsen, part of the Warburg–Sarnau line, was closed in 1977 and dismantled in 1983.

Operations 
Regional trains stopping in Warburg are: Regional-Express trains to Düsseldorf (RE 11: Rhein-Hellweg-Express) and to Hagen (RE 17: Sauerland-Express) and Regionalbahn trains via Paderborn to Münster (RB 89: Ems-Börde-Bahn).

InterCity trains also stop in Warburg.

Warburg station is part of the Paderborn-Höxter Regional Transport Association (Nahverkehrsverbund Paderborn-Höxter). Services to and from Hesse are covered by the Nordhessischer Verkehrsverbund (North Hesse Transport Association).

Accessibility 
A bus station is located in front of the building, catering for bus services in the city of Warburg and the surrounding villages.

References

Railway stations in North Rhine-Westphalia
Railway stations in Germany opened in 1851
1851 establishments in Prussia
Buildings and structures in Höxter (district)